Yan Youmin (1918–2001) was a People's Republic of China politician. He was born in Chengcheng County, Shaanxi Province. He was the 1st Chairman of the People's Standing Congress of Shanghai (1981).

1918 births
2001 deaths
People's Republic of China politicians from Shaanxi
Chinese Communist Party politicians from Shaanxi
Political office-holders in Shanghai
Delegates to the 5th National People's Congress
Chinese police officers
Politicians from Weinan
People of the Republic of China